The Basketball Bundesliga 2008–09 was the 43rd season of the Basketball Bundesliga.

Teams

Main Round Standings

Playoffs

See also
 Basketball Bundesliga 2009–10
 German champions

External links
German League official website  

Basketball Bundesliga seasons
German
1